Creekwood, near Creekstand, Alabama, was built c.1844.  It was listed on the National Register of Historic Places in 1989.  The listing included two contributing buildings.

It is a two-story, four-over-four plan house on brick and mortar piers.  In the 1920s it was expanded with a two-story wing on the west and a one-story wing on the north.  It has a full façade porch with Tuscan columns, and a 3/4 width upper story balustraded balcony.

References

National Register of Historic Places in Macon County, Alabama
Greek Revival architecture in Alabama
Houses completed in 1850